Limay is a municipality of Bataan, the Philippines.

Limay may also refer to:
 Limay, Yvelines, a commune of France
 Canton of Limay
 Limay River, a river in Argentina

See also 
 Limay formation, a geologic formation in Argentina
 Limay Mahuida, a village in Argentina
 Limay Refinery, an oil refinery in the Philippines
 Limey
 San Juan de Limay, a municipality in Nicaragua